, officially abbreviated as Ghost in the Shell AAA, is a 2015 Japanese animated television series, based on Masamune Shirow's manga Ghost in the Shell and the Ghost in the Shell: Arise pentalogy. The episodes were recompiled from the pentalogy, and therefore share the same cast and crew of Kazuchika Kise as director, Tow Ubukata as writer and Cornelius as composer. AAA is animated by Production I.G, and began airing in Japan on April 5, 2015, broadcasting from the Tokyo MX, KBS, Sun TV, TV Aichi, HTB, OX, SBS, TVQ and BS11 networks.

The opening theme is "Anata o tamotsu mono" by Maaya Sakamoto (who also plays the role of Major Kusanagi) and Cornelius.

Episodes

Chronological order
 Ghost Pain - introduces Unit 501
 Ghost Whispers - continues the formation of Section 9
 Ghost Tears - introduces Dr. Zhinzhee Bekka Arr Thied
 Ghost Stands Alone - Dr. Zhinzhee Bekka Arr Thied appears again
 Pyrophoric Cult

See also 
 List of Ghost in the Shell: Stand Alone Complex episodes
 List of Ghost in the Shell: S.A.C. 2nd GIG episodes

References

External links 
  

Arise
Ghost In The Shell: Arise - Alternative Architecture